Antihero is a protagonist who lacks conventional heroic qualities such as idealism, courage, or morality.

Antihero may also refer to:

Music
 Antihero (album), a 2022 album by Huskii
 Anti-Hero (Slaine and Termanology album), 2017
 "Anti-Hero" (song), a 2022 song by Taylor Swift from Midnights
 "Anti Hero (Brave New World)", a 2012 song by Marlon Roudette
 Anti-Heros, an American Oi!/street punk band
 Anti-Heroes (Lee Konitz and Gil Evans album), 1980
 Anti-Heroes (Auryn album), 2013

Other uses
 Antihero (video game), a 2017 video game
"Anti-Hero", an episode of American TV series Superman & Lois